The following is a list of fire stations of the Hong Kong Fire Services.

All but one of Hong Kong's fire stations are located in Hong Kong (Shenzhen Bay is located across the border in Shekou, Shenzhen)

Hong Kong Command

West Division

Central Division

East Division

Marine and Offshore Islands Division

Kowloon Command

West Division

South Division

East Division

Central Division

New Territories Command

South West Division

South Division

West Division

East Division

North Division

Airport Fire Contingent

Former fire stations
Former fire stations include:

See also
 List of fire departments

References

External links

 Distribution of Fire Stations in Hong Kong

Public health and safety in Hong Kong

Government buildings in Hong Kong
Hong Kong